John Wallace McCreery was the Democratic President of the West Virginia Senate from Raleigh County and served from 1891 to 1893.

References

Democratic Party West Virginia state senators
1845 births
1917 deaths
19th-century American politicians
Presidents of the West Virginia State Senate
People from Monroe County, West Virginia
People from Raleigh County, West Virginia